The Slingshot (lit. "Story of a Man") is a 2009 South Korean television series starring Park Yong-ha, Park Si-yeon, Kim Kang-woo, Han Yeo-woon, Lee Phillip, and Park Ki-woong. It aired on KBS2 from April 6 to June 9, 2009 on Mondays and Tuesdays at 21:55 for 20 episodes.

The Slingshot is about a wronged hero who gets himself thrown in jail, then formulates the ultimate plan for vengeance by enlisting the help of a few prison buddies to form a team, and beating the villain at his own game. It won Best Drama Series at the 2009 Seoul International Drama Awards.

This was Park Yong-ha's last acting project before he committed suicide in June 2010.

Plot
In the blink of an eye, Kim Shin (Park Yong-ha) loses everything dear to him. His father's company goes bankrupt, his brother commits suicide, his girlfriend (Park Si-yeon) leaves him, and he himself ends up in jail for a crime he didn't commit. While in prison, Shin learns that all of this was brought about by corporation head Chae Do-woo (Kim Kang-woo), who devised the scam that brought down his father. Determined to beat Do-woo at his own game, Shin sets out to get revenge, no matter the cost. More and more people are pulled into the unforgiving battle of wits as stakes are raised, secrets are revealed, and love turns into a weapon.

Cast

Main characters
Park Yong-ha as Kim Shin 
Park Si-yeon as Seo Kyung-ah
Kim Kang-woo as Chae Do-woo 
Han Yeo-woon as Chae Eun-soo 
Lee Phillip as Do Jae-myung
Jung Chanwoo as young Do Jae-myung 
Park Ki-woong as Ahn Kyung-tae
Lee Moon-sik as Park Moon-ho

Supporting characters
Jang Se-jin as Beom-hwan
Kim Hyung-bum as Joong-ho
Baek Jae-jin as Yong-shik
Jeon Jae-hyung as Jae-seop
Jang Hang-sun as President Chae
Kim Roi-ha as Director Oh
Park Sun-woo as Danny
Lee Seung-bok as Lee Dae-pyo
Heo Wook as Kei
Han Song-yi as Yeon-hee
Kim Mi-kyung as Detective Kim
Choi Ji-na as Madam Jang
Lee Byung-joon as Do Man-hee
Bang Eun-hee as Myung-sun
Ahn Nae-sang as Kim Wook
Jeon Sung-hwan as Mayor
Won Deok-hyun as young Chae Do-woo 
Min Joon-hyun as hospital official
Lee Tae-im
Choi Yoon-young

Ratings

Source: TNS Media Korea

Awards and nominations

International broadcast
It aired in Japan on cable channel BS, followed by terrestrial network TBS.

References

External links
 The Slingshot official KBS website 
 
 

Korean-language television shows
2009 South Korean television series debuts
2009 South Korean television series endings
Korean Broadcasting System television dramas
South Korean thriller television series
South Korean action television series
Television shows written by Song Ji-na